The San Matías–San Carlos Protection Forest (Bosque de Protección San Matías-San Carlos) is a national forest situated in Pasco Region, Peru.  It is a forest set aside to preserve the soils and to protect infrastructure, towns, and agricultural grounds against the effects of the water erosion, huaycos, streams or floods. It lies within the Peruvian Yungas and Ucayali moist forests ecoregions.

It also allows for the maintenance and development of the cultural values of the native communities, such as the Ashaninkas, and Amueshas.

References

See also
Natural and Cultural Peruvian Heritage

National forests of Peru
Geography of Pasco Region